The General Aviation Manufacturer's Association (GAMA) is the industry trade association representing general aviation (non-military & non-airliner) aircraft manufacturers and related enterprises, chiefly in the United States. It is headquartered in Washington, D.C., with an office in Brussels, Belgium.

History
Light aircraft manufacturers in the United States were typically members of the Aerospace Industries Association (originally called the Aeronautical Chamber of Commerce), which represented all aircraft manufacturers in the U.S. catering to military aviation, commercial aviation and general aviation.

Increasing division of interests and priorities, and the disproportionate power of the military and commercial aircraft manufacturers, led to the establishment of a new organization to represent general aviation aircraft manufacturers. The organization was established as the Utility Aircraft Council, until its director died suddenly. That organization's public relations man, Ed Stimpson, took the reins and evolved the organization into GAMA in 1970.

Initially, GAMA represented general aviation fixed-wing aircraft (not helicopter) manufacturers in the United States only. It has since grown to embrace aircraft manufacturers in other countries, with an additional office in Brussels, Belgium. In 2011, GAMA members voted to open GAMA membership to helicopter manufacturers as well.

GAMA has also expanded its membership to include producers of general aviation engines, avionics,  spare parts and related services. The organization claims to represent over 80 manufacturers.

Issues and outcomes
GAMA serves as a:

 Political lobbying group, representing the interests of the manufacturers of general aviation aircraft and products to governments
 Industry data and information clearinghouse, public relations and reporting service (particularly publishing quarterly aircraft production data and the annual GAMA Statistical Yearbook and Industry Outlook, which typically contains an annualized summary of the quarterly reports, over several years, with additional general aviation statistics, and analysis)
 Industry partnering organization, providing for joint efforts by general aviation manufacturers towards shared goals (among these, various industry promotions, training, scholarships and awards programs)

Among the issues dealt with by GAMA have been:

 Encouraging people to become lightplane pilots
 Lobbying for manufacturing and safety standards suiting the GAMA members
 Establishment of the Airport and Airway Trust Fund
 Allocation of aviation fuel during the Arab oil embargo of the mid-1970s
 Dealing with the impact of the PATCO strike by the Professional Air Traffic Controllers Organization that crippled U.S. aviation in the 1980s
 Leading the (eventually successful) effort to pass the General Aviation Revitalization Act, which shields manufacturers of light aircraft from lawsuits over crashes of small aircraft that are 18 years old or older (This act, passed in 1994 after several years of GAMA lobbying, is credited with reviving the small aircraft industry, which had been hard hit by a rapidly rising tide of crash-lawsuits)
 Corporate risk managers' opposition to corporate aviation 
 Shortages of aviation fuel for piston-powered aircraft
 Government attempts to tax general aviation through "user fees"
 The shift of general aviation away from mass-market, piston-powered light aircraft to narrow-market, high-priced business jets and turboprops

Members
Current member organizations are:

Aircraft manufacturers
 Air Tractor, Inc.
 Airbus Helicopters
 Beechcraft
 Bell Helicopter
 Boeing Business Jets
 Bombardier Aerospace
 Cessna Aircraft Company
 Cirrus Aircraft
 CubCrafters, Inc.
 DAHER-SOCATA
 Dassault Falcon
 Diamond Aircraft Industries
 Eclipse Aerospace
 Embraer
 Flight Design GmbH
 Gulfstream Aerospace Corporation
 Nextant Aerospace, LLC
 Piaggio Aero Industries S.p.A.
 Pilatus Aircraft, Ltd.
 Piper Aircraft, Inc.
 Quest Aircraft Company
 Sabreliner Corporation
 Thrush Aircraft Inc.
 Universal Hydrogen Co.

Engine manufacturers
 Continental Aerospace Technologies
 GE Aviation
 GE Honda Aero Engines, LLC
 Honeywell - Business & General Aviation
 Lycoming Engines
 Pratt & Whitney Canada
 Rolls-Royce
 SMA
 Williams International

Avionics manufacturers
 Aero-Mach Labs
 Appareo
 Aspen Avionics
 Avidyne Corporation
 Cobham Avionics, Integrated Systems
 Dynon, Inc.
 Esterline CMC Electronics
 FreeFlight Systems
 Garmin International Inc.
 Innovative Solutions & Support, Inc.
 L-3 Communications - Products Group
 Collins Aerospace
 Safe Flight Instrument Corporation
 Sandel Avionics, Inc.
 Thales Canada Inc.
 Universal Avionics Systems Corp.

Component manufacturers and service providers
 ATP
 Avfuel Corporation
 Aviall, Inc
 B/E Aerospace, Inc.
 BBA Aviation
 Blackhawk Modifications, Inc.
 Bosch General Aviation Technology GmbH
 BRS Aerospace
 CAE SimuFlite
 CAV Aerospace, Inc.
 Duncan Aviation
 Extant Components Group
 FlightSafety International, Inc.
 ForeFlight, LLC
 General Aviation Modifications, Inc
 GKN Aerospace Transparency Systems Inc.
 Greenwich AeroGroup
 Hartzell Propeller, Inc.
 ICE Corporation
 International Communications Group (ICG)
 Jeppesen
 Jet Aviation
 Jet Support Services, Inc.
 Kaman Corporation
 Meggitt Safety Systems Inc.
 Meggitt Sensing Systems
 NORDAM
 Parker Aerospace
 PATS Aircraft Systems
 PPG Aerospace
 Redbird Flight Simulations, Inc.
 SimCom International
 StandardAero
 Stevens Aviation
 Taylor-Deal Aviation LLC
 Teton Aviation Group, LLC
 Triumph Group, Inc.
 UTC Aerospace Systems
 Wipaire, Inc.
 Woodward, Inc.

Leadership and key people
Ed Stimpson (died 2009) headed GAMA for 25 years as its first president and shaped the identity and role of the organization. 

Drew Steketee served as communications director from 1980 to 1987.

Pete Bunce is the current president and CEO since 2005.

See also
 General aviation in Europe
 General aviation in the United Kingdom

References

External links

Aviation organizations